The 2019 Saskatchewan Roughriders season was the 62nd season for the team in the Canadian Football League. It was the club's 110th year overall and its 104th season of play. The Roughriders qualified for the playoffs for the third consecutive year and hosted a playoff game for the second consecutive year. They finished 13–5 in the regular season (their best record since 1970) and finished first place in the West Division for only the second time since 1976 and the first time winning the West Division crown since 2009. The 2019 West Final was the first time that the game was held at the new Mosaic Stadium and the second time a playoff game was held at the venue, the first coming during the previous season in 2018. 

This was Craig Dickenson's first season as head coach and Jeremy O'Day's first full season as general manager following the sudden departure of Chris Jones, who held both roles for the previous three years.

Offseason

Foreign drafts
For the first time in its history, the CFL held drafts for foreign players from Mexico and Europe. Like all other CFL teams, the Roughriders held three non-tradeable selections in the 2019 CFL–LFA Draft, which took place on January 14, 2019. The 2019 European CFL Draft took place on April 11, 2019 where all teams held one non-tradeable pick.

CFL draft
The 2019 CFL Draft took place on May 2, 2019. The Roughriders had six selections in the eight-round draft after trading their third-round pick in a package for Vernon Adams and their seventh-round pick for Brian Jones.

Preseason

Regular season

Standings

Schedule 
To accommodate for the viewership of the Toronto Raptors' 7:00pm CST NBA Finals Game 6 start time on June 13, the CFL moved up the start time of the league opener that same day from 5:30pm to 5:00pm.

In the late evening of August 9 at 9:06pm EDT, a weather delay was declared at Percival Molson Memorial Stadium in Montreal due to an approaching thunderstorm with intense lightning; the Roughriders were leading the Alouettes 17–10 with 2:41 left in the 3rd quarter. Because the game had not restarted by 10:06pm EDT and over 7:30 had been played in the 3rd at that point, the game was decided to be official and the 17–10 score was declared final.

The Roughriders played an unusually long three game road trip in October to accommodate the National Hockey League's Heritage Classic which was staged at Mosaic Stadium for the first time.

Post-season

Schedule

Team

Roster

Coaching staff

References

External links
 

Saskatchewan Roughriders seasons
2019 Canadian Football League season by team
2019 in Saskatchewan